Hasan Bagi-ye Rika (also Romanized as Ḩasan Bagī-ye Rīkā and Ḩasan Bakī-ye Rīkā; also known as Rīkā) is a village in Kuhdasht-e Jonubi Rural District, in the Central District of Kuhdasht County, Lorestan Province, Iran. At the 2006 census, its population was 54, in 10 families.

References 

Towns and villages in Kuhdasht County